Jonathan Chipalo (born 22 March 1962) is a Zambian sprinter. He competed in the men's 400 metres at the 1988 Summer Olympics.

References

1962 births
Living people
Athletes (track and field) at the 1988 Summer Olympics
Zambian male sprinters
Olympic athletes of Zambia
Place of birth missing (living people)